Dhaalu Airport is a regional domestic airport located on the island of Kudahuvadhoo in Dhaalu Atoll in the Republic of Maldives. It was built by Reollo Investments Pvt. Ltd. and is operated by Dhaalu Airport Holdings.

History

The airport began operations in 2017, with the first aircraft landing at Dhaalu Airport on June 1, 2017.

Facilities
The airport was built entirely on 63 hectares of reclaimed land and features a runway of 1,800 metres allowing it to accommodate Dash-8 and ATR-72  aircraft as well as large private jets.

Dhaalu Airport is the first airport in Maldives to make extensive use of solar airfield lighting.

Currently, Manta Air is the only airline offering scheduled service at the airport.

Airlines and destinations

References

External links 
 http://www.dhaalu-airport.com/

Airports in the Maldives
Airports established in 2017